Suv hovuzi is an urban-type settlement in Samarkand Region, Uzbekistan. It is part of Kattakurgan District. The town population in 1989 was 4668 people.

References

Populated places in Samarqand Region
Urban-type settlements in Uzbekistan